Counterfeit Lake is a circular, natural freshwater lake in Highlands County, Florida. Much of the time, the lake is more of a swamp, rather than a lake. Griffin Grove Road, which looks more like a private grove road than a public road, reaches the north shore of the lake. Counterfeit Lake is completely surrounded by citrus groves and cannot be seen from either branch of Lake Letta Road. This lake has a  surface area.

There is no public boat ramp or swimming beach.  This lake can be fished.  According to the Hook and Bullet website, this lake contains bullhead, bowfin and gar.

References

Lakes of Highlands County, Florida
Lakes of Florida